Phlogiellus inermis is a small species of tarantula, commonly known as the Singapore tarantula. It is found in areas from Malaysia to Indonesia. These small, common tarantulas are nocturnal, living in leaf litter especially at the base of tree trunks, and even in homes.  The females are about 20 mm in size, and males are smaller at about 17 mm in size.

References

Marshall, Samuel D. Tarantulas and Other Arachnids. Barrons, 2001. 

Theraphosidae
Spiders of Asia
Spiders described in 1871
Taxa named by Anton Ausserer